Team dressage equestrian at the 2010 Asian Games was held in Guangzhou Equestrian Venue, Guangzhou, China on 14 November 2010.

Each horse and rider pair performed a FEI Prix St-Georges Test. The Prix St-Georges Test consists of a battery of required movements that each rider and horse pair performs. Five judges evaluate the pair, giving marks between 0 and 10 for each element. The judges' scores were averaged to give a final score for the pair. The best three scores from each team's four members were summed to give a team score. The results from this event also served as a qualifier for the individual dressage event.

Schedule
All times are China Standard Time (UTC+08:00)

Results 
Legend
RT — Retired

References
Results at FEI website
Results

External links
Official website 

Team dressage